Fort Sam Houston National Cemetery is a United States National Cemetery in the city of San Antonio in Bexar County, Texas. Administered by the United States Department of Veterans Affairs, it encompasses , and as of 2014, had over 144,000 interments.  The cemetery was listed on the National Register of Historic Places in 2016.

History 
Although the Army post in the area was established in 1875, and construction of Fort Sam Houston began the following year, no burials were made in the area that is currently the cemetery until 1926. In 1931  were added as an addition to San Antonio National Cemetery. In 1937, the addition became a National Cemetery in its own right, renamed Fort Sam Houston National Cemetery. In 1947 several other forts in Texas, including Fort McIntosh, were closed and their cemetery interments were transferred to Fort Sam Houston National Cemetery. 

Interred at the Fort Sam Houston National Cemetery are 140 Axis prisoners of war (POWs) from World War II who died in captivity. 133 are German, 4 are Italian, and 3 are Japanese. These POWs were disinterred from various Texas prisoner of war camps and reburied at Fort Sam Houston National Cemetery.  Among these POWs is Hugo Krauss, a German murdered by fellow German POWs at Camp Hearne in 1943.  When originally interred, these graves were isolated from the American graves.

Two gravestones marked with swastikas were replaced on December 24, 2020. The Military Religious Freedom Foundation had demanded their removal in May 2020, but the Veterans Administration (VA) resisted on the grounds that they were historical. The VA resisted until Senator Ted Cruz (R-TX) and Congressen Will Hurd (R-TX23) and Kay Granger (R-TX12) put pressure on them.

Notable interments 
 Medal of Honor recipients
 Staff Sergeant Lucian Adams, for action in World War II.
 Master Sergeant Roy Benavidez, for action in the Vietnam War.
 Colonel Cecil Hamilton Bolton, for action in World War II.
 Staff Sergeant William J. Bordelon, for action at the Battle of Tarawa in World War II.
 Platoon Sergeant William George Harrell, for action at Battle of Iwo Jima in World War II.
 Second Lieutenant Lloyd Herbert Hughes, for action in Operation Tidal Wave in World War II.
 Private Milton A. Lee, for action in the Vietnam War.
 Sergeant First Class Jose M. Lopez,  for action in World War II.
 First Lieutenant James E. Robinson, Jr., for action in World War II.
 Chief Warrant Officer Louis R. Rocco, for action in the Vietnam War.
 Master Sergeant Cleto Luna Rodriguez, for action in World War II.
 Colonel Seth Lathrop Weld, for action in the Philippine–American War.
 Other notable interments
 Colonel Charlie Beckwith, creator of 1st Special Forces Operational Detachment-Delta (Delta Force).
 Colonel Doc Blanchard, Heisman Trophy winner for 1945
 Brigadier General Oscar Bergstrom Abbott, Commanding General of Camp Beale during World War II.
 Brigadier General Bertram A. Bone, USMC; was a Commanding officer of 1st Defense Battalion during World War II.
 General Richard E. Cavazos, United States Army's first Hispanic four-star general.
 Lt. Colonel Granville C. Coggs, prominent U.S. medical doctor, U.S. Army Air Force/U.S. Air Force/U.S. Air Force Reserves officer, and trained bombardier pilot with the famed Tuskegee Airmen or "Red Tails." First African American to serve as a staff physician at the Kaiser Hospital in San Francisco, California.
 Major General Mary E. Clarke, final director of the Women's Army Corps 
 Lt. Colonel Richard E. Cole, Doolitle Raider
 Brigadier General Lillian Dunlap, former chief of the United States Army Nurse Corps, recipient of the U.S. Army Distinguished Service Medal, the Meritorious Service Medal, and the Army Commendation Medal (with oak leaf cluster).
 Gustavo "Gus" C. Garcia, Mexican-American civil rights attorney
 Joseph A. Green, commander of Coastal Artillery Corps
 Robert Gottschall, actor working under the name Robert Shaw, and former United States Army Lieutenant Colonel.
 Lieutenant General Charles P. Hall, commanded the 93rd Infantry Division and XI Corps in World War II.
 General Henry I. Hodes, U.S. Army four-star general
 Major General Harry H. Johnson, commander of the  2nd Cavalry Division and 93rd Infantry Division during World War II.
 Brigadier General Charles I. Murray, USMC. A recipient of Navy Cross and Army Distinguished Service Cross.
 Brigadier General John L. Pierce, World War II commander of 16th Armored Division in European theater.
 Captain William Millican Randolph, namesake of Randolph Air Force Base.
 Major General Emil F. Reinhardt, World War II commander of 69th Infantry Division and IX Corps.
 Joe Sage, member of the Texas House of Representatives from Bexar County from 1973 to 1975
 Frank Tejeda, US Congressman.
 Colonel Gerald Evan Williams, Commander of the 391st Bombardment Group, 1943–1945
 Major General Roscoe B. Woodruff, World War II commander of 77th and 24th Infantry Divisions and VII Corps in both European and Pacific theaters.
Carlos Martinez, CEO and President of the American GI Forum National Veterans Outreach Program
 Other noteworthy interments
 27 Buffalo Soldiers who served during the Indian Wars.
 140 Axis prisoners of war from World War II.
 4 British Royal Air Force officers from World War II.

References

External links 
 National Cemetery Administration
 Fort Sam Houston National Cemetery
 
 
 

Cemeteries in Texas
Historic American Landscapes Survey in Texas
United States national cemeteries
1875 establishments in Texas
Geography of San Antonio
Protected areas of Bexar County, Texas
Tourist attractions in San Antonio
Cemeteries on the National Register of Historic Places in Texas
National Register of Historic Places in San Antonio
Joint Base San Antonio